Jimena Florit (born May 18, 1972 in Olivos, Vicente López) is a female cyclist from Argentina, specializing in competitive mountain biking.

Florit twice represented her native South American country at the Summer Olympics (2000 and 2004), where she finished in 20th and 12th place in the final rankings of the women's cross-country race. In 2003, she claimed the gold medal at the Pan American Games in Santo Domingo, Dominican Republic, defeating USA's Mary McConneloug (silver) and Chile's Francisca Campos (bronze).

References
sports-reference

1972 births
Living people
Argentine female cyclists
Cross-country mountain bikers
Cyclists at the 2000 Summer Olympics
Cyclists at the 2004 Summer Olympics
Cyclists at the 2003 Pan American Games
Pan American Games gold medalists for Argentina
Olympic cyclists of Argentina
People from Vicente López Partido
Pan American Games medalists in cycling
Medalists at the 2003 Pan American Games
Sportspeople from Buenos Aires Province
21st-century Argentine women